Ben Hand (born 24 April 1982 in Sydney, Australia) is an Australian rugby union player who plays for the Brumbies in Super Rugby. His playing position is lock. He made his Super Rugby debut for the Waratahs during the 2007 Super 14 season against the Lions in Johannesburg.

Hand will join French PRO D2 team Grenoble at the conclusion of the 2012 Super Rugby season.

References

External links 
Fiche et Statistiques du joueur sur Métro-Sports
Brumbies profile

1982 births
Living people
Australian rugby union players
Rugby union locks
ACT Brumbies players
New South Wales Waratahs players
Rugby Calvisano players
FC Grenoble players
Expatriate rugby union players in France
Expatriate rugby union players in Italy
Rugby union players from Sydney